The Union of the Democratic Centre (Enosi Dimokratikou Kentrou, EDIK) is a social liberal political party in Greece.

The party was founded on 5 February 1976, two years after the end of the Greek military junta of 1967–74, asserting itself to be the ideological successor of the pre-1967 Centre Union party. EDIK was the result of the merger of Centre Union – New Forces and the Democratic Centre Union of Ioannis Zidgis.  Its party leader at the time was George Mavros who earlier led the Center Union – New Forces; Mavros, though, would join the Panhellenic Socialist Movement (PASOK) a couple of years later. The party was led by Zidgis in the early 1980s, and has since adopted more social-democratic positions.

With the Greek political spectrum shifting to the left, EDIK was increasingly marginalized, with PASOK replacing it as the country's second major party. The party's support collapsed in the elections of 1981, when it gained 0.7% of the vote and was shut out of Parliament. However, George Mavros was elected as an independent on a PASOK ticket, and again in 1985, when EDIK and PASOK officially co-operated. In 1989, EDIK ran independently and did not elect any representatives in parliament.

From 1998 to 2011, the party president was Neoklis Sarris, and the party operated mostly as a forum of political analysis and public, ideological debates. In the 2009 legislative elections Neoklis Sarris ran for Democratic Revival. In 2012 the Union of the Democratic Centre was reconstructed. Stavros Karabelas was elected new president of the party and shifted the political characteristics of the party to the left. Consequently, in the May 2012 election the party participated as part of the Coalition of the Radical Left (SYRIZA).

Leaders 
George Mavros
Ioannis Zidgis
Neoklis Sarris
Stavros Karabelas

Elections 
 1977 – 12 seats
 1981 – 1 seat
 1985 – 1 seat

External links
EDIK movement

Liberal parties in Greece
Social democratic parties in Greece
Radical parties
Social liberal parties
Political parties established in 1976
Centrist parties in Greece
Components of Syriza